Sarcaulus wurdackii is a species of plant in the family Sapotaceae. It is endemic to Peru.

References

Flora of Peru
wurdackii
Vulnerable plants
Trees of Peru
Taxonomy articles created by Polbot
Taxa named by André Aubréville